The Second Battle of Arquijas (5 February 1835) was a battle of the First Carlist War.  It followed the First Battle of Arquijas.  The battle was a second attack on the positions of Carlist commander Tomás de Zumalacárregui at the pass at Arquijas, Navarre.

Liberal commander Francisco Espoz y Mina sent 5,000 infantry and cavalrymen into the field.  9,000 Liberal troops were at Estella under Manuel Lorenzo, Marcelino de Oraá Lecumberri, and three other generals.  Espoz y Mina gave orders for the passage of the Ega River at Arquijas.

Meanwhile, Zumalacárregui had 8,500 men.  His generals were Ituralde, Guibelalde, Villareal, and Miguel Gómez Damas.

On 5 February Liberal forces took posts opposite the Carlists on the other bank of the Ega River. They then attacked at several points, but were repulsed, suffering heavy casualties.  They retreated to their entrenched towns.

References 

1835 in Spain
Conflicts in 1835
February 1835 events

Battles of the First Carlist War
Battles in Navarre